Lepley is a surname. Notable people with the surname include:

Tucker Lepley (born 2002), American soccer player
Tyler Lepley (born 1987), American actor

See also
Lapp

English-language surnames